Zezva Gafrindauli  was one of the leaders during 1659 and the Bakhtrioni uprising. Leader of Tushetians. With his leadership Georgian mountain tribes assaulted Safavid garrisons in Georgian fortresses and turcoman els. During the Battle of Bakhtrioni he commanded the units that first crossed fortress walls, killed guards and opened gates for a larger army to enter. After fortress was captured Gafrindauli's unit chased the enemy and took part in a battle on Alazani valley, which ended in Georgian victory. after this Zezva was fortified in Pankisi fortress. He was captured after a betrayal and imprisoned in Tbilisi, later he was executed.

References

Sources
 
 
 

17th-century people from Georgia (country)
Rebels from Georgia (country)